The Chalinze by-election was a by-election held in Tanzania for the parliamentary constituency of Chalinze. It was triggered by the death of Saidi Bwanamdogo, the previous Member of Parliament (MP) who had held the seat for the Chama Cha Mapinduzi since 2010. The by-election took place on 6 April 2014 and the CCM candidate won by a landslide.

Results

References

By-elections in Tanzania
2014 elections in Tanzania
April 2014 events in Africa